International Business College (IBC) is a for-profit college located in El Paso, Texas. The institution was founded in 1898 and is the oldest college in El Paso. IBC awards diplomas and associate degrees and has been accredited by the Accrediting Council for Independent Colleges and Schools since 1969.

History

The school was founded in downtown El Paso in 1898 by Joseph Peter Mullin (whose son was Shimer College president Francis Joseph Mullin).  Shortly after Mullin's death in 1921, it was sold to J.E. Gilkey in 1922. The school received its first accreditation two years later, from the National Association of Commercial Schools.

In the 1980s, the school opened numerous branch campuses, as far away as Lubbock, Texas.  By 1993, these had all been sold, as part of a decision to focus on El Paso, where the school continues to operate two locations.  In 2003, the school was accredited to offer its first degree program, the Associate of Applied Science in Business Management.  In 2012, it was sold to Innovative Education Solutions.

Academics

IBC offers courses in three main categories: Business, Technology, and Health Care.  Most students enroll in short-term certifications in health care. The school is accredited to offer associate degree programs in business, criminal justice, and paralegal studies, but as of 2013 only the business program had any enrollees.

Accreditation
International Business College was accredited by the Accrediting Council for Independent Colleges and Schools until May 2016 to award diplomas and associate degrees.

Notable alumni
Lucy G. Acosta, class of 1945

References

External links
Official website

For-profit universities and colleges in the United States
Universities and colleges in El Paso, Texas
1898 establishments in Texas
Educational institutions established in 1898